The 1967 Essex County Council election took place on 15 April 1967 to elect members of Essex County Council in England.

Summary

|}

References

Essex
Essex County Council elections
1960s in Essex